Ewondo or Kolo is the language of the Ewondo people (more precisely  Beti be Kolo or simply Kolo-Beti) of Cameroon. The language had 577,700 native speakers in 1982. Ewondo is a trade language. Dialects include Badjia (Bakjo), Bafeuk, Bamvele (Mvele, Yezum, Yesoum), Bane, Beti, Enoah, Evouzok, Fong, Mbida-Bani, Mvete, Mvog-Niengue, Omvang, Yabekolo (Yebekolo), Yabeka, and Yabekanga. Ewondo speakers live primarily in Cameroon's Centre Region and the northern part of the Océan division in the South Region.

Ewondo is a Bantu language. It is a dialect of the Beti language (Yaunde-Fang), and is intelligible with Bulu, Eton, and Fang.

In 2011 there was a concern among Cameroonian linguists that the language was being displaced in the country by French.

Distribution
Ewondo (Beti) covers the whole of the departments of Mfoundi, Mefou-et-Afamba, Mefou-et-Akono, Nyong-et-So'o, Nyong-et-Mfoumou (Central Region), and part of Océan Department (Southern Region).

History
The Ewondo language originated in the forests south of the Sanaga river.

Phonology

Consonants

Vowels

Alphabet system 

The tones are indicated with diacritics on the vowels:
 the high tone is indicated with an acute accent: ;
 the mid tone is indicated with a macron: ;
 the low tone, the most frequent tone, is indicated by the absence of diacritics: ;
 the rising tone is indicated with a caron: ;
 the falling tone is indicated with a circumflex: .

See also
Ewondo Populaire

References

External links

Ewondo alphabet and pronunciation
Database of audio recordings in Ewondo - basic Catholic prayers

Beti languages
Languages of Cameroon